Adam Tyc (born 5 September 1986) is a Czech sport shooter with two gold medals in the IPSC Production division from the 2005 and 2008 IPSC Handgun World Shoots. At the 2005 World Shoot he was only 18 years old and also became Junior World Champion. He is also two time European champion (2004 and 2007), and has several IPSC Czech Handgun Championship titles. Adam is a member of CZ Shooting Team

References

Living people
IPSC shooters
Czech male sport shooters
1986 births